Catherine Briat is a French diplomat and writer. After working for large media groups such as RTL and Radio France, she joined the diplomatic service. She has served in Ottawa and in Berlin, where she was the director of the Institut français. Her novel Le divan rouge was published by Editions Heloise d'Ormesson.

References

French women writers
Living people
Year of birth missing (living people)
Place of birth missing (living people)
RTL Group people
Radio France people